The National Research Institute of Chinese Medicine (NRICM; ; previously: National Institute of Chinese Medicine) is a research center responsible for research, experimental and development issues of Chinese medicine. It is located in the Beitou District, Taipei, Taiwan and run under the guidance of the Ministry of Education of the Republic of China. It is Taiwan's largest Chinese herbal medicine research center.

History
In March 1956, the Executive Yuan passed the Chinese Medicine Educational Law Bill to set up a Chinese medicine school and establish a research organization. In 1957, the preparatory office of the Chinese Medicine Research Institute was established in Taipei. The National Research Institute of Chinese Medicine was finally established formally on 22 October 1963 under Department of Health. On 23 July 2013, the institute was placed under the Ministry of Education.

Directors 
 Li, Huan-shen (1963-1979)
 Liu, Guo-zhu (1979-1988)
 Chen, Chieh-fu (1988-2004)
 Wu, Tsung-neng (2004)
 Wu, Tian-shung (2004-2007)
 Lee, Te-chang (2007-2009)
 Huang, Yi-tsau (2009-2016)
 Guh, Jih-Hwa (2016-2018)
 Chang, Fang-Rong (2018-2020)
 Su, Yi-Chang (2020-)

Transportation
The research center is accessible within walking distance north of Shipai Station of Taipei Metro.

See also

 Healthcare in Taiwan

References

External links
Official Website
Pine Pollen Powder

1963 establishments in Taiwan
Medical research institutes in Taiwan
Traditional Chinese medicine